Manjari Bhargava is a former diver of India. She was awarded Arjuna Award by Government of India in 1974 for excellence in diving. She hails from Rajasthan state.

External links
 Arjun Award Winners for "Swimming"

Living people
Indian female divers
Recipients of the Arjuna Award
Sportswomen from Rajasthan
Rajasthani people
1956 births
20th-century Indian women